Bear Swamp is a swamp in Cumberland County, southwestern New Jersey, notable for its  of old-growth forests and the birds they contain. It is divided into two areas, Bear Swamp East and Bear Swamp West, separated from each other by gravel mines and roads.

Bear Swamp West contains broadleaf swamp forest dominated by black gum, American sweetgum, red maple, and sweetbay magnolia. Other trees present are American beech, swamp white oak, and American holly. Some  of this forest is old-growth filled with trees of impressive sizes and ages.

Bear Swamp East is in Belleplain State Forest. It has forests similar to Bear Swamp West, but with large Tulip Poplar on hummocks, some reaching  in diameter and 400 years of age.

As many as 30 bald eagles nest in the swamp, and it is home to the oldest continuously occupied bald eagle nest in New Jersey.  It is a breeding site for red-shouldered hawks, barred owls, and Cooper's hawks, all species of concern in the state.  It is one of just two known breeding sites in southern New Jersey for pileated woodpeckers.

See also
List of old growth forests
Glades Wildlife Refuge

References

Old-growth forests
Landforms of Cumberland County, New Jersey
Swamps of New Jersey